The Éclaireurs de la Nature (Association of Scouts of Nature, EDLN) is a Buddhist Scout movement, founded in 2007. The association has about 1 000 members divided into eight groups, as of 2018. EDLN is a member of the World Buddhist Scout Brotherhood (WBSB) is a federation partner of World Organization of the Scout Movement and full member of Scoutisme Français, as of 2017. EDLN is a member of the Buddhist Union of France.

See also
Scouting in France

References

External links
Official website 

Scouting and Guiding in France
2007 establishments in France